Giles Creek is a  long 1st order tributary to the Haw River, in Rockingham County, North Carolina.

Course
Giles Creek rises in Rockingham County, North Carolina on the divide between Giles Creek and Country Line Creek.  Giles Creek then flows southwest to meet the Haw River about 2 miles south of Williamsburg, North Carolina.

Watershed
Giles Creek drains  of area, receives about 46.3 in/year of precipitation, has a topographic wetness index of 432.03 and is about 37% forested.

See also
List of rivers of North Carolina

References

Rivers of North Carolina
Rivers of Rockingham County, North Carolina